Kinshasa Thermal Power Station, also Kinshasa Plastics Waste–To–Energy Plant, is a planned plastics-fired thermal power plant in the city of Kinshasa, the capital of the Democratic Republic of the Congo, with an estimated  population of 15 million inhabitants, as of August 2021. The waste-to-energy power station will, in the first phase, convert 200 tonnes of plastic waste everyday into " of industrial lubricants,  of diesel fuel, and three metric tonnes of char (solid carbon)" on a daily basis. In addition, it will in the process, generate 96 MWh of energy, on an annual basis. The power generated will be sold to the Congolese electricity utility company Société Nationale d'Électricité (SNEL), for intergradation into the national electricity grid.

Location
The power station would be located in the city of Kinshasa, the national capital and largest city in the country.

Overview
The plastics-to-energy industrial complex is under development, primarily to address the dire situation of plastic waste in the city of Kinshasa. As of August 2021, it was estimated that 9,000 tonnes of solid waste are generated in the city, every day, of which the majority is used plastics.

The owner/developers of this plant, plan to take 200 tonnes of used plastics every day and convert it into electricity, industrial lubricants, diesel fuel and solid carbon (char). The process involved is called pyrolysis, where the plastic waste is heated at a temperature above , in an environment starved of oxygen. The  gases produced are then compressed and used to drive electricity generators. As the gases cool down the liquid products are distilled off, and the solid char is left behind.

Developers
The power station is under development by Clean-Seas Inc., a "provider of waste management technology solutions", an American enterprise, based in the state of Delaware.

Cost, funding and timetable
The construction budget is quoted as US$30 million (€25 million). Clean-Seas Inc. will design, develop, build, operate and maintain the power plant for 30 years after commissioning. The contracts include a guaranteed source of plastic waste for the entire 30 years. The development funding will be provided by Clean-Seas, with borrowed money from "development partners".

See also 

 List of power stations in the Democratic Republic of the Congo
 Kibo Gauteng Thermal Power Station
 Dandora Waste to Energy Power Station

References

External links
 Website of Clean-Seas Inc.

Power stations in the Democratic Republic of the Congo
Proposed energy infrastructure
Kinshasa